Hussein Hafiz (born September 5, 1985 in Cairo) is an Egyptian judoka. He competed in the men's 73 kg event at the 2012 Summer Olympics; after defeating Osman Murillo Segura in the second round, he was eliminated by Ugo Legrand in the third round.

References

External links
 

1985 births
Living people
Egyptian male judoka
Olympic judoka of Egypt
Judoka at the 2012 Summer Olympics
African Games bronze medalists for Egypt
African Games medalists in judo
Competitors at the 2011 All-Africa Games
21st-century Egyptian people